The women's 1500 metres sprint competition of the athletics events at the 1979 Pan American Games took place on 13 July at the Estadio Sixto Escobar. The defending Pan American Games champion was Jan Merrill of the United States.

Records
Prior to this competition, the existing world and Pan American Games records were as follows:

Results
All times are in minutes and seconds.

Final

References

Athletics at the 1979 Pan American Games
1979